Syagrus perpuncticollis is a species of leaf beetle from the Democratic Republic of the Congo, described by  in 1940.

References

Eumolpinae
Beetles of the Democratic Republic of the Congo
Beetles described in 1940
Endemic fauna of the Democratic Republic of the Congo